Harald Gabriel Hjärne (2 May 1848, in Klastorp, Skövde – 6 January 1922, in Uppsala) was a Swedish historian.
 
Hjärne held one of the chairs of history at Uppsala University from 1889 until 1913, and was a member of the Swedish Academy 1903 - 1922. He was a member of the Second Chamber of the Riksdag 1902-1908 and of its First Chamber 1912-1918.

References

1848 births
1922 deaths
People from Skövde Municipality
20th-century Swedish historians
Members of the Swedish Academy
Swedish politicians
Burials at Uppsala old cemetery
19th-century Swedish historians